Phebe Novakovic is an American businesswoman and former intelligence officer. She serves as the Chairwoman and Chief Executive Officer of General Dynamics. As of 2018, she is listed as the world's 25th most powerful woman in business by Forbes.

Biography

Early life
Phebe Novakovic is of Serbian descent.
Phebe Novakovic graduated from Smith College in Northampton, Massachusetts in 1979 and received an M.B.A. from the Wharton School of the University of Pennsylvania in Philadelphia, Pennsylvania in 1988.

Career
She worked for the Central Intelligence Agency. From 1997 to 2001, she worked for the United States Department of Defense.

She joined General Dynamics in 2001. She became president and Chief Operation Officer in 2012. She has served as the Chairman of the Board and Chief Executive Officer of General Dynamics since January 2013.

She has sat on the Board of Directors of Abbott Laboratories since 2010. As of 2018, she is listed as the 25th most powerful woman in the world by Forbes, rising from 56th in 2015 and 65th in 2014.  In 2020 she was appointed a director of J. P. Morgan Chase.

References

21st-century American businesspeople
21st-century American businesswomen
American chairpersons of corporations
American chief executives of Fortune 500 companies
American chief operating officers
American corporate directors
American people of Serbian descent
American women chief executives
General Dynamics
Living people
People of the Central Intelligence Agency
Smith College alumni
United States Department of Defense officials
Wharton School of the University of Pennsylvania alumni
Women corporate directors
1957 births